The 2014 IIHF U18 World Championship Division II was a pair of international under-18 ice hockey tournaments organised by the International Ice Hockey Federation. The Division II A and Division II B tournaments represent the fourth and the fifth tier of the IIHF World U18 Championship.

Division II A
The Division II A tournament was played in Dumfries, Great Britain, from 24 to 30 March 2014.

Participants

Final standings

Results
All times are local. (Western European Time – UTC±0 / 30 March 2014: Western European Summer Time – UTC+1)

Division II B
The Division II B tournament was played in Tallinn, Estonia, from 14 to 20 April 2014.

Participants

Final standings

Results
All times are local. (Eastern European Summer Time – UTC+3)

References

IIHF World U18 Championship Division II
2014 IIHF World U18 Championships
International ice hockey competitions hosted by the United Kingdom
2014
2014 in Scottish sport
2013–14 in Estonian ice hockey
World
Sport in Dumfries and Galloway
Sports competitions in Tallinn
March 2014 sports events in Europe